Krasnokutsky (masculine), Krasnokutskaya (feminine), or Krasnokutskoye (neuter) may refer to:
Krasnokutsky District, a district of Saratov Oblast, Russia
Krasnokutskaya, a rural locality (a stanitsa) in Rostov Oblast, Russia